The Healy House at 565, formerly 625  Perugia Way in the Bel Air district of Los Angeles was built in 1949 by the Modernist architect Lloyd Wright, son of Frank Lloyd Wright  for a P.J. Healy. He then sold it to Prince Aly Khan, who lived there in the last year of his marriage to Rita Hayworth. Elvis Presley rented the house from the new owner, the Shah of Iran's deposed father  in the 1960s and it was the site of The Beatles only meeting with Presley on 27 August 1965.

A letter writer to the Los Angeles Times in 1998 described the house as offering "...a graceful and optimistic view of the future: a Usonian ranch house nestled in the bowl of a concrete flying saucer that hovers over the golf course below" and its replacement as a "kitschy and grandiose neo-baroque structure".

References

Houses completed in 1952
Houses in Los Angeles
Bel Air, Los Angeles